James Hamilton Riddell (6 February 1891 – 1952) was a Scottish footballer who played for Rangers, Dumbarton, Clyde,  Partick Thistle, Kilmarnock, St Mirren, Millwall, Fulham, Wigan Borough and Caernarfon.

References

1891 births
1952 deaths
Scottish footballers
Dumbarton F.C. players
Partick Thistle F.C. players
Clyde F.C. players
Rangers F.C. players
Kilmarnock F.C. players
Fulham F.C. players
Millwall F.C. players
Wigan Athletic F.C. players
Scottish Football League players
English Football League players
St Mirren F.C. players
Association football midfielders
Footballers from Glasgow
People from Gorbals
Ashfield F.C. players
Scottish Junior Football Association players